The 2015 Metro Atlantic Athletic Conference baseball tournament was held from May 20 through 24. The top six regular season finishers of the league's eleven teams met in the double-elimination tournament held at Dutchess Stadium in Wappingers Falls, New York. Second-seeded  won their second tournament championship to earn the conference's automatic bid to the 2015 NCAA Division I baseball tournament.

Seeding
The top six teams were seeded one through six based on their conference winning percentage. They then played a double-elimination tournament.

Results

All-Tournament Team
The following players were named to the All-Tournament Team.

Most Valuable Player
Connor Panas was named Tournament Most Valuable Player.  Panas had 13 hits in 26 at bats, with 10 runs scored and 12 driven in for the Tournament.

References

Tournament
Metro Atlantic Athletic Conference Baseball Tournament
2015 in sports in New York (state)